Yangsan is a city in Gyeongsangnam-do Province, South Korea.

It borders Ulsan to the northeast, Gijang-gun and Geumjeong-gu in Busan to the southeast, Gimhae to the southwest, and Miryang to the northwest. City Hall is located in Nambu-dong, Yangsan-si.

Administrative divisions

Currently, Yangsan is made up of 1 Eup (administrative division), 4 Myeon (administrative division) and 8 Dong.

A city flag 
Yangsan City means that it will open up as a future city with a bright, hopeful 21st century like magnolia, the flower of the city, and symbolizes Yangsan's strong will to build a first-class mass-production as the center of economy, society and culture in the eastern inland.

Attractions
Tongdosa Temple
Naewon Temple
Yangsan Tower
Yangsan Stadium
Eden Valley Ski Resort
Hongryong Falls
Yangsan Wondong Plum Blossom Festival

Climate

Transportations

Railways
Yangsan has two stations on the Gyeongbu Line: Mulgeum station (물금역) and Wondong station (원동역). The nearest KTX stations are Ulsan station in Ulsan and Gupo station in Busan.

Subway
Busan Subway Line 2 serves the city, with five stations currently operating: Yangsan Station, Namyangsan Station, Busan National University Yangsan Campus station, Jeungsan station and Hopo station. An additional station that will connect with the Yangsan Metro is currently under construction.

Yangsan Metro is under construction and is scheduled to open in 2024.

Bus
The city of Yangsan is served by a local bus system. In addition to serving the city itself, there are long-distance local buses to Busan, as well as inter-city lines connecting to Ulsan, Changwon, Gyeongju, and several other cities.

Highways
The Gyeongbu Expressway (#1) and the Jungang Expressway Branch Line (#551) run through the city of Yangsan.

In addition, National Route 35 bisects the city center.

Sister cities
 
 Yurihonjō, Akita, Japan (Oct. 10, 1998)

Notable people
Winter (birthname: Kim Minjeong), member of Aespa.
Kang Hye-won, member of Iz*One.
Yves (birthname: Ha Sooyoung), member of Loona.
Bae (birthname: Bae Jin-sol), member of Nmixx.
Ha Minwoo, member of ZE:A.

See also
 List of cities in South Korea

References

External links
City government website

 

 
Cities in South Gyeongsang Province